Marcel Lucien (1902-1958) was a French cinematographer.

Selected filmography
 The Woman with Closed Eyes (1926)
 The Garden of Allah (1927)
 Baroud (1932)
 Night at the Crossroads (1932)
 Boudu Saved from Drowning (1932)
 Miss Helyett (1933)
 The Barber of Seville (1933)
 The Queen of Biarritz (1934)
 Confessions of a Cheat (1936)
 The Dying Land (1936)
 Rigolboche (1936)
 Josette (1937)
 The House Opposite (1937)
 Captain Benoit (1938)
 Rail Pirates (1938)
 Alert in the Mediterranean (1938)
 Three from St Cyr (1939)
 Fire in the Straw (1939)
 Hangman's Noose (1940)
 Forces occultes (1943)
 Inspector Sergil (1947)

References

Bibliography
 Nicholas Macdonald. In Search of La Grande Illusion: A Critical Appreciation of Jean Renoir's Elusive Masterpiece. McFarland, 2013.

External links

1902 births
1958 deaths
French cinematographers
People from Antibes
20th-century French people